Alexander Sarkissian was the defending champion but chose not to defend his title.

Max Purcell won the title after Andrew Whittington  retired while trailing 3–6, 7–6(8–6), 5–1 in the final.

Seeds

Draw

Finals

Top half

Bottom half

References
 Main Draw
 Qualifying Draw

Gimcheon Open ATP Challenger - Singles
2016 Singles